Jakub Biskup (born 8 May 1983) is a Polish footballer who plays as a midfielder for III liga side Bałtyk Gdynia.

External links
 
 

1983 births
Living people
Polish footballers
Association football midfielders
Ekstraklasa players
Bałtyk Gdynia players
Lechia Gdańsk players
Odra Wodzisław Śląski players
ŁKS Łódź players
Piast Gliwice players
Bruk-Bet Termalica Nieciecza players
Chojniczanka Chojnice players
People from Puck, Poland